is a Japanese game designer. He was born in Mishima, Shizuoka Prefecture and graduated from College of Engineering of  Nihon University.
He is best known as designer of video game LocoRoco, but he also contributed to  Ico level design.

External links

 Interview with Tsutomu Kouno on The 1UP Show

Japanese video game designers
1972 births
Living people
Nihon University alumni